This is a list of aircraft of the Army Air Corps of the  United Kingdom.

Aircraft
From its founding in 1942:

Airspeed Horsa
Auster AOP.6
General Aircraft Hamilcar
General Aircraft Hotspur
Taylorcraft Auster
Waco Hadrian
Waco YKC and ZGC-7 – Two civil aircraft purchased by the British Army in Egypt and used by the Long Range Desert Group.

Since its separation from the Royal Air Force in 1957

Helicopters
 Agusta A109 – Retired
 Boeing AH-64E Apache
 Bristol Sycamore - Retired
 AgustaWestland AW159 Wildcat
 Bell 212
 Eurocopter AS365 Dauphin
 Eurocopter Squirrel – Retired
 Saunders-Roe Skeeter – Retired
 Sud Aviation Alouette II – Retired
 Westland Apache
 Westland Gazelle
 Westland Lynx – Retired
 Westland Scout – Retired
 Westland Sioux – Retired

Fixed wing
 Auster AOP.9 – Retired
 Britten-Norman Islander/Defender – Transferred to the RAF 2019
 de Havilland Canada Beaver – Retired
 de Havilland Canada Chipmunk – Retired
 Grob Tutor light fixed wing trainer (at 674 Squadron, DEFTS and Army flying Grading)
 Slingsby Firefly T-67M260 (at 674 Squadron, DEFTS) – Retired, withdrawn December 2010.
 Slingsby Firefly 160 (at Army Flying Grading) – Retired, withdrawn December 2010.

Weapons and munitions

Missiles
AS.11 – MCLS wire-guided air-to-surface anti-tank missile. Carried by the Westland Scout - Retired
AGM-114 Hellfire – Air-to-surface, laser-guided anti-tank missile.
BGM-71 TOW – Air-to-surface, anti-tank guided missile. Carried by the Westland Lynx.

Unguided air-to-air rockets
 68-mm (2.7-inch) SNEB air-to surface rockets - Retired
 70-mm (2.75-inch) CRV7 air-to-surface rockets

Cannon
 30-mm M230 Chain Gun

Machine guns
 7.62-mm FN MAG general purpose machine gun
 12.7-mm (0.50-inch) M2 Browning heavy machine gun

See also
List of aircraft of the Royal Air Force
List of aircraft of the Fleet Air Arm

Notes and references

External links
Army Air Corps at official British Army website

Army Air Corps (United Kingdom)
Army Air Corps aircraft
United Kingdom British Army Air Corps, List of aircraft of the